Ala is the smallest of the "Brass Knuckles", a series of equatorial dark regions on Pluto. It is named after Ala  "earth", the chthonic and most important deity of the Igbo people.

References

Regions of Pluto